Antonio Benedetti (9 March 17151788) was an Italian scholar, antiquarian, and professor of classic Greco-Roman literature.

For many years, he was professor of rhetoric at the Jesuit college in Rome. He published an annotated edition of Plautus in Latin (Rome, 1754). He also published a treatise titled Dissertazione su le medaglie greche, non ancora descritte dagli antiquarii (1777) with notes from the Abbot Oderico of Genoa.

References

1715 births
1788 deaths
18th-century Italian writers
18th-century Italian male writers
Italian antiquarians
Italian numismatists
People from Fermo